Palpita annulifer is a moth in the family Crambidae. It was described by Inoue in 1996. It is found in Thailand, Taiwan, India, Indonesia (Sumatra, Java, Borneo) and the Philippines.

References

Moths described in 1996
Palpita
Moths of Asia